The following lists events that happened during 1999 in Republic of Albania.

Incumbents 
 President: Rexhep Meidani
 Prime Minister: Pandeli Majko (until 29 October), Ilir Meta (starting from 29 October)

Events

March 
 24 March - Nato air strikes against Yugoslav military targets. In Kosovo thousands flee attacks by Serb forces. Mass refugee exodus into Albania.

October 
 Majko resigns as prime minister in October 1999, after losing Socialist Party leadership vote. 30-year-old Ilir Meta becomes Europe's youngest prime minister.

References 

 
1990s in Albania
Years of the 20th century in Albania